"Mistakes" is a song by English DJ Jonas Blue and English singer-songwriter Paloma Faith. The song was released on 28 February 2020 by Positiva and Virgin EMI. The song was written by Paloma Faith, Uzoechi Emenike, James Norton, Guy James Robin and Aaron Zuckerman.

Background
Talking about the song, Jonas Blue said, "'Mistakes' is such a special one for me, I've wanted to work with Paloma for a long time, and this just connected the dots for us to be able to collaborate in a perfect way. I'm happy I managed to get some influences in there from my UK house and garage upbringing too." Paloma Faith said, "I feel so excited about 'Mistakes'. I am a huge fan of MNEK who co-wrote the song and also of the dance power of Jonas. I can't help but move to this tune. It's a banger!"

Music video
A music video to accompany the release of "Mistakes" was first released onto YouTube on 16 March 2020.

Track listing

Charts

Release history

References

  

2020 singles
2020 songs
Jonas Blue songs
Songs written by MNEK
Paloma Faith songs
Songs written by Paloma Faith
Songs written by Jonas Blue